Wait a Minute is the fourth studio album by Dutch rock and roll and blues group Herman Brood & His Wild Romance. After the commercial and artistic debacle of Go Nutz and the disastrous recording of that album, the Wild Romance fell apart, though Dany Lademacher and Freddy Cavalli still played on this album, the last recorded with the "old" Wild Romance.

On the Dutch album chart, the album reached #26 on 20 September 1980, and stayed on the chart for five weeks.

Track listing

Personnel
Herman Brood - piano, keyboards, vocals
Freddy Cavalli - bass
Dany Lademacher - guitar
Cees Meerman - drums

References 

1980 albums
Herman Brood & His Wild Romance albums